Nokbeon Station is a station on Seoul Subway Line 3 in Eunpyeong-gu, Seoul.

Station layout

References 

Railway stations in South Korea opened in 1985
Seoul Metropolitan Subway stations
Metro stations in Eunpyeong District
Seoul Subway Line 3